Gobinda Chandra Langthasa (23 January 1932 - 3 February 2018) was an Indian politician from the state of Assam. He was a member of Assam Legislative Assembly for Haflong. He was also a cabinet minister in the first Tarun Gogoi cabinet, and Deputy Chief Minister of Assam under Hiteswar Saikia.

Early life and education 
Langthasa was born on 23 January 1932 between 5:00 and 6:00 A.M to the late Thangrung Langthasa and the late Kenodi Langthasa. He was born in Nutan Wadrengdisa village, Dima Hasao. Langthasa had a Graduate Standard from British Institute of England in 1955-1956.

Political career 
In 1952, aged 20, Langthasa joined the Congress Party as a worker under Maibang Block Congress Committee and he took active part for the District Council Elections, Legislative Assembly Election of the ST (Hills) Autonomous District, the then un-divided Assam comprising Khasi and Jaintia Hills, United Karbi Hills and North Cachar Hills.

Later in April 1952, Langthasa endorsed Bonily Khongmen, J.B. Hagjer and S.C. Hojai in their elections.

In 1957, Langthasa for the first time voted in the MLA and District Council Election and also supported an MP candidate.

In 1962, Langthasa was elected to the N.C.Hills Autonomous Council from Gunjung Constituency, and became Executive Member until 1967. In 1967 he was again re-elected as Member of the N.C.Hills Autonomous Council from the same constituency and became Executive Member until 1972. In 1972 he was elected as Chief Executive Member of N.C.Hills Autonomous Council till 1983.

In the 1983 Assam Legislative Assembly election, Langthasa stood as an Independent candidate for the constituency of Haflong. He received 16313 votes, 58.03% of the total vote and became MLA of the constituency. He defeated his nearest opponent by 4513 votes. He then became a minister in the Hiteswar Saikia cabinet.

In the 1985 Assam Legislative Assembly election, Langthasa sought reelection in Haflong, however he instead received the Congress nomination for the seat. He received 29205 votes, 61.24% of the total vote and he defeated his nearest opponent by 16964 votes.

In 1991, he sought reelection. He received 33868 votes, 61.73% of the total vote and he defeated his nearest opponent by 12868 votes. He was made Deputy Chief Minister under Hiteswar Saikia.

In 1996, he lost his seat by 13671 votes.

However in 2001, he again received the congress nomination for Haflong. He received 33781 votes, 45.44% of the total vote and again became MLA. He was made HAD minister in the Tarun Gogoi cabinet.

In the 2006 Assam Legislative Assembly election, Langthasa sought reelection. He received 40154 votes, defeating his nearest opponent by 7818 votes. He was appointed protem speaker of the Assembly by Governor Ajai Singh. He was not inducted into the second Tarun Gogoi cabinet  but he was appointed the Chairman of Assam State Transport Corporation (ASTC) and member of Gauhati University Court & Council.

In the 2011 Assam Legislative Assembly election, he sought reelection. He received 38076 votes, 57.04% of the total vote, defeating his nearest opponent by 25488 votes. He did not seek reelection in the 2016 Assam Legislative Assembly election and his son, Nirmal Langthasa, was the congress candidate but lost.

Personal life 
Langthasa married Anjola Langthasa on 13 March 1959. They had 5 sons and two daughters. His wife predeceased him. In 2003, Langthasa’s 4th youngest son was killed at Haflong by militants and in the following year, 2004, his youngest son Nirmal Langthasa was kidnapped by the ULFA and was held captive for a period of four months when he was Assam’s HAD Minister. In June, 2007, Langthasa’s eldest son Purnendu Lagthasa, the then Chief Executive Member of NCHAC was killed by the militants while he was on election campaigning at Langlai Hasnu Village, Dehangi. Another of his sons predeceased him, dying of natural causes.

According to Langthasa’s profile at the state legislature, he enjoyed playing football, swimming and drama/dancing. He also had a special interest in  reading history books, ancient records and the lives and history of great people.

Death and funeral 
In January 2018, Langthasa suffered a cerebral stroke and was admitted to hospital. Langthasa died at Down Town hospital in Guwahati around 1:30 am on 3 February 2018, aged 86. He was survived by 2 sons and 2 daughters. His body was received at different places of the district right from Manderdisa, Hatikhali, Langting, Kalachand, Maibang and Mahur. Most of the people were Congress leaders and party members who offered floral tribute to their leader.  The last rites of Langthasa were performed after a procession was taken out on the streets of Haflong in his honour. Congress MP Biren Sing Engti, Congress leaders Nalendra Karigapsa, Birat Langthasa and former EM Bimal Hoja participated in the funeral procession. While hundreds of people joined the procession, representatives of several parties and organizations paid their last tributes. His body was cremated at Haflong Town Swasan Ghat after the procession in Haflong.

Positions 

 1962: Member, North Cachar Hills Autonomous Council
 1967: Member, North Cachar Hills Autonomous Council
 1972: Chief Executive Member, North Cachar Hills Autonomous Council
 1983: Member, Assam Legislative Assembly
 1983: Cabinet Minister, Government of Assam
 1985: Member, Assam Legislative Assembly
 1987: President, Dima Hasao District Congress Committee 
 1991: Member, Assam Legislative Assembly
 1991: Deputy Chief Minister, Government of Assam
 2001: Member, Assam Legislative Assembly
 2001: HAD minister, Government of Assam
 2006: Member, Assam Legislative Assembly
 2006: Chairman, Assam State Transport Corporation
 2006: Member, Gauhati University Court & Council.
 2011: Member, Assam Legislative Assembly

References 

1932 births
2018 deaths
Assam politicians
Assam MLAs 1983–1985
Assam MLAs 1985–1991
Assam MLAs 1991–1996
Assam MLAs 2001–2006
Assam MLAs 2006–2011
Assam MLAs 2011–2016
Deputy chief ministers of Assam
State cabinet ministers of Assam
People from Dima Hasao district